Cumberford is a surname. Notable people with the surname include:

 Dave Cumberford, Australian association football player
 Jock Cumberford, Australian association football player
 Robert Cumberford (born 1935), American automotive designer, author, and design critic